The 1963 Kentucky Derby was the 89th running of the Kentucky Derby. The race took place on May 4, 1963.

Full results

Winning Breeder: John W. Galbreath; (KY)

References

1963
Kentucky Derby
Derby
Kentucky
Kentucky Derby